The Lavender Hill Mob is a 1951 comedy film from Ealing Studios, written by T. E. B. Clarke, directed by Charles Crichton, starring Alec Guinness and Stanley Holloway and featuring Sid James and Alfie Bass. The title refers to Lavender Hill, a street in Battersea, a district in London SW11, near to Clapham Junction railway station.

The British Film Institute ranked The Lavender Hill Mob the 17th greatest British film of all time. The original film was digitally restored and re-released to UK cinemas on 29 July 2011 to celebrate its 60th anniversary. It is one of fifteen films listed in the category "Art" on the Vatican film list.

Plot
Henry Holland lives the life of luxury in Rio de Janeiro, and spends an evening dining out with a British visitor. During their meal, he narrates a story concerning how he changed his life by instigating an intricate gold bullion robbery. One year ago, Holland served as an unambitious London bank clerk, who for twenty years was in charge of gold bullion deliveries. Although dedicated to his job due to his reputation for fussing over details, he had begun to devise a scheme to steal a consignment of gold bullion. However, his plan had a flaw - selling it on the black market in Britain was too risky, and he was at a loss as to how to smuggle it abroad. 

One evening at his boarding house in Lavender Hill, he meets with artist Alfred Pendlebury, who has taken up lodgings in the building. A conversation with him leads him to discover that Pendlebury owns a foundry that makes presents and souvenirs that are sold in holiday destinations, one of which is Paris.

Realizing that Pendlebury is the key to his plan's success, Holland explains his scheme to the artist who agrees to help. When the clerk discovers he is due to be transferred to another bank department, the pair quickly move their plan into action, recruiting the aid of petty thieves, Lackery Wood and Shorty Fisher. On the day of the robbery, Wood and Fisher hijack the bullion van and switch the gold to one of Pendlebury's works van. Holland then assumes the role of an unfortunate victim who is hailed as a hero for raising the alarm, after nearly drowning by accident. As his associates melt down the gold bullion and recast it as Eiffel Tower paperweights to be exported abroad, Holland gives false statements and misleading clues to the police, led by Inspector Farrow. The group soon toast to their success, despite Wood and Fisher being unable to travel to Paris to collect their share in person, entrusting the other two to provide it.

The day after their last consignment of stolen gold is sent to Paris, Holland and Pendlebury head to France to retrieve them from a souvenir kiosk atop the Eiffel Tower supplied by Pendlebury's firm. However, the pair are horrified when they find one of the boxes containing the golden paperweights has been opened by mistake due to a language mix-up. Discovering six have been sold to a group of English schoolgirls, the pair make a wild chase to pursue after them back to Britain. Both manage to track down the schoolgirls, but only manage to get back five of the paperweights. The girl holding the sixth one refuses, intending to deliver it to a policeman she is friends with. Holland and Pendlebury pursue after the girl, and watch in horror as it is brought to an exhibition of police history and methods at Hendon Police College. Holland's worst fears come true when Farrow, having begun to realize the truth, spots the paperweight and orders a chemical test on it.

Left with no choice, Holland snatches it, and he and Pendlebury make their escape in a stolen police car. A confusing pursuit begins across London, as Holland uses the car's radio to feed false, misleading information to the officers pursuing the pair. However, both find themselves forced to offer a passing police officer a lift on the car's footplate, causing them to be eventually discovered. As Pendlebury becomes trapped, Holland escapes with the six golden paperweights, which leave him with a tidy sum to enjoy a new life. After finishing his tale to his visitor back in the present day, Holland admits that the money is now all gone. As the pair prepare to leave, the visitor is revealed as a police officer, and that Holland has been finally arrested for his crime as the story concludes.

Cast

Cast notes
Audrey Hepburn makes an early film appearance in a small role as Chiquita near the start of the film. Robert Shaw also made his first film appearance, playing a police laboratory technician towards the end of the film. English actress Patricia Garwood made her first film appearance in this movie at the age of nine.

Production
Charles Crichton says the origin of the film came with the success of The Blue Lamp. Michael Balcon, head of Ealing, got screenwriter Clarke to come up with ideas for a follow up. 

Clarke is said to have come up with the idea of a clerk robbing his own bank while doing research for the film Pool of London (1951), a crime thriller surrounding a jewel theft. He consulted the Bank of England on the project and it set up a special committee to advise on how best the robbery could take place.

Extensive location filming was made in both London and Paris. The scenes show a London still marked by bomb sites from the Second World War.

London, England, UK
Bank Underground Station
Bank of England, Threadneedle Street
Bramley Arms Pub, Bramley Road, Notting Hill (finale: end of the chase)
Cheapside
Carlton Road, Ealing (zebra crossing on way to police exhibition)
Gunnersbury Park (police exhibition)
Queen Victoria Street, Blackfriars (scene of bullion robbery)
RAF Northolt, Ruislip (airport)

Paris, France
River Seine
Eiffel Tower

The scene where Holland and Pendlebury run down the Eiffel Tower's spiral staircase and become increasingly dizzy and erratic, as does the camera work, presages James Stewart's condition in Alfred Hitchcock's Vertigo, made seven years later. A film montage of sensational newspaper headlines marks the crime as taking place in August 1950, whilst posters for the Hendon exhibition state that it marks the centenary of the death of Sir Robert Peel, which occurred on 2 July 1850. In the car chase scene at the end of the film, an officer uses a police box to report seeing a police car being driven by a man in a top hat. In fact, the driver is a modern-day police officer from the exhibition wearing the uniform of the police as originally set up in 1829 by Peel, known as "Bobbies" or "Peelers" after him.

Reception
The Lavender Hill Mob had its charity world premiere at the Marble Arch Odeon cinema in London on 28 June 1951. The film was popular at the British box office. It had rentals of $580,000 at the U.S. box office.

Awards and honours
The film won the Academy Award for Best Writing, Story and Screenplay. Guinness was nominated for the award of Best Actor in a Leading Role. The film also won the BAFTA Award for Best British Film.

Stage adaptation 
A stage adaptation of the film written by Phil Porter and directed by Jeremy Sams opened in October 2022 at the Everyman Theatre, Cheltenham before touring the UK, starring Miles Jupp as Henry Holland and Justin Edwards as Alfred Pendlebury.

See also
1951 in film
BFI Top 100 British films
British films of 1951
Heist film

References
Notes

Bibliography
Vermilye, Jerry. The Great British Films. Citadel Press, 1978.  pp. 147–149

External links

The Lavender Hill Mob review at Old Movies

1951 films
1950s heist films
Cultural depictions of Metropolitan Police officers
Best British Film BAFTA Award winners
British black-and-white films
British crime comedy films
British heist films
Ealing Studios films
Films scored by Georges Auric
Films about bank robbery
Films directed by Charles Crichton
Films produced by Michael Balcon
Films set in London
Films set in Paris
Films whose writer won the Best Original Screenplay Academy Award
1950s French-language films
Portuguese-language films
Films with screenplays by T. E. B. Clarke
1950s crime comedy films
1951 comedy films
Eiffel Tower in fiction
1950s English-language films
1950s British films